Niklas Hellberg (born 1964) is a Swedish musician and producer, most known for his collaborations with punk rocker Thåström.

Biography
Hellberg was during the late 1980s a member of the post-punk band All That Jazz until its breakup in 1990. Hellberg was along with Thåström the main songwriters in Peace Love & Pitbulls an industrial rock band inspired by German industrial band Einstürzende Neubauten and Swedish heavy metal band Entombed. After the band's break up in 1997 Hellberg continued to work with Thåström on his solo records both during recordings and tours. Around 2003 Hellberg and Thåström founded Sällskapet along with guitarist Pelle Ossler, which released their self-titled album in 2007.

Discography
With All That Jazz
All That JAzz (1987)
Color Blind (1990)

With Peace Love and Pitbulls
Peace Love & Pitbulls (1993)
Red sonic underwear (1994)
Das neue konzept EP (1995)
3 (1997)
War in My Livingroom 92–97 (2007)

With Thåström
Mannen som blev en gris (2002)
Skebokvarnsv. 209 (2005)
Solo Vol 1 (2006)
Kärlek är for dom (2009)

With Sällskapet
Sällskapet (2007)

References
Jeff Giles Cutouts Gone Wild!: So Long, and Thanks for All That Jazz popdose.com Retrieved: 2009-08-04
All That Jazz... rayfallcreations.com Retrieved: 2009-08-04
Håkan Engström Thåström satsade på det nya sydsvenskan.se Retrieved: 2009-08-04
Thåström – Sommarturné, video och delvis nytt band! unitedstage.se Retrieved: 2009-08-04
Susanna Bergström Sällskapet – Hellberg, Ossler, Thåström dagensarbete.se Retrieved: 2009-08-04
Thåström/Hell biography dustmusic.net Retrieved: 2009-08-04
David Borgerius Thåström släpper nytt – i gott sällskap tv4.se Retrieved: 2009-08-04

External links
Sällskapet MySpace

Swedish songwriters
Swedish rock musicians
1964 births
Living people